Tobias Franek (born 29 July 1996) is an Austrian male BMX rider, representing his nation at international competitions. He competed in the time trial event at the 2015 UCI BMX World Championships.

References

External links
 
 
 

1996 births
Living people
BMX riders
Austrian male cyclists
Cyclists at the 2014 Summer Youth Olympics
European Games competitors for Austria
Cyclists at the 2015 European Games
People from Eisenstadt
Sportspeople from Burgenland
21st-century Austrian people